Stephen Holland (born 1941) is an American artist, known for his portraits of athletes and celebrities. Holland's most famous paintings have been of Muhammad Ali.

As a young painter, Holland could not afford to hire live models. The images he found in boxing magazines became his subjects. Holland attended the School of Industrial Art (now called the High School of Art and Design), which devoted half of each day to art studies. Later, he attended Pratt Institute, the Art Students League and the School of Visual Arts, all in New York City.
 
In addition to being the official artist of the Los Angeles Kings, Holland is one of the twelve artists selected by the United States Olympic Committee to represent the 100th Anniversary of the Olympics. He completed eleven paintings for the Baltimore Ravens' Walk of Fame, commemorating their path of victory to Super Bowl XXXV. In 2008, his art commemorated the year-long celebration of the Los Angeles Dodgers' 50 years in Los Angeles.

References

External links
Holland's Art agency
Official art gallery

1941 births
American artists
Living people
Artists from the Bronx
High School of Art and Design alumni